Henri Hiltl (born Heinrich Hiltl) (8 October 1910 – 25 November 1982) was an Austrian, naturalized French footballer.

References

External links
 Profile at FFF

1910 births
1982 deaths
Footballers from Vienna
People from Brigittenau
Austrian footballers
Austria international footballers
French footballers
France international footballers
Association football forwards
Excelsior AC (France) players
Racing Club de France Football players
Ligue 1 players
CO Roubaix-Tourcoing players
Dual internationalists (football)
Austrian emigrants to France
French people of Austrian descent